Club Social y Deportivo San Jorge is an Argentine football club based in the city of San Miguel de Tucumán of Tucumán Province. The team currently plays in Torneo Argentino A, the regionalised third division of the Argentine football league system.

San Jorge is one of the youngest clubs of Argentina, having achieved some success in local football. In 2011 the club debuted in Torneo Argentino B where finished 2nd. on first stage. The team eliminated teams such as Chaco For Ever (which defeated 3–0 in Chaco), 9 de Julio de Morteros reaching the finals against Guaraní Antonio Franco. San Jorge was defeated so the team went to playoffs against a team from Torneo Argentino A.

San Jorge faced Comodoro Rivadavia's team Comisión de Actividades Infantiles, winning the decisive match 3–1 as visitor therefore promoting to Argentino A.

On 23 June 2019, during the 2018–19 Torneo Federal A promotion play-off final second leg against Alvarado, San Jorge refused to finish the match in protest at the refereeing. Their players sat down on fifty minutes, before eventually walking off which led to the fixture being abandoned - which gave Alvarado promotion to Primera B Nacional.

Players

Current squad

References

External links
San Jorge at Interior Futbolero website

 
Association football clubs established in 2008
2008 establishments in Argentina